Events from the year 1734 in Scotland.

Incumbents 

 Secretary of State for Scotland: vacant

Law officers 
 Lord Advocate – Duncan Forbes
 Solicitor General for Scotland – Charles Erskine

Judiciary 
 Lord President of the Court of Session – Lord North Berwick
 Lord Justice General – Lord Ilay
 Lord Justice Clerk – Lord Grange

Events 
 8 April – 6 August: Siege of Gaeta in the Kingdom of Naples (War of the Polish Succession) at which Charles Edward Stuart is present, his only military experience prior to the Jacobite rising of 1745.

Births 
 7 May – James Byres, architect and antiquary (died 1817)
 29 September – William Julius Mickle, poet (died 1788)
 7 October – Ralph Abercromby, British Army general and politician (died 1801 of wounds received at Battle of Alexandria)
 15 December – John Maclaurin, judge and poet (died 1796)
 Robert Aitken, printer and publisher in Philadelphia, first to publish an English language Bible in the U.S. (died 1802 in the United States)

Deaths 
 21 March – Robert Wodrow, historian (born 1679)
 May – Alexander McGill, architect (born c. 1680)
 28 December – Rob Roy MacGregor, clan chief (born 1671)

See also 

 Timeline of Scottish history

References 

 
Years of the 18th century in Scotland
Scotland
1730s in Scotland